Gefapixant (MK-7264) is a drug which acts as an antagonist of the P2RX3 receptor, and may be useful in the treatment of chronic cough. It was named in honour of Geoff Burnstock.

References 

Benzosulfones
Sulfonamides
Diaryl ethers